Smith Township may refer to the following places:

In Canada

Smith Township, Peterborough County, Ontario (historic, now part of Selwyn township)

In the United States

Arkansas
Smith Township, Cleveland County, Arkansas
Smith Township, Cross County, Arkansas
Smith Township, Dallas County, Arkansas
Smith Township, Lincoln County, Arkansas
Smith Township, Saline County, Arkansas

Indiana
Smith Township, Greene County, Indiana
Smith Township, Posey County, Indiana
Smith Township, Whitley County, Indiana

Kansas
Smith Township, Thomas County, Kansas

Missouri
Smith Township, Dade County, Missouri
Smith Township, Worth County, Missouri
and also: May/Smith Township, Laclede County, Missouri

North Carolina
Smith Township, Duplin County, North Carolina

North Dakota
Smith Township, Towner County, North Dakota

Ohio
Smith Township, Belmont County, Ohio
Smith Township, Mahoning County, Ohio

Pennsylvania
Smith Township, Washington County, Pennsylvania

South Dakota
Smith Township, Brule County, South Dakota

See also

Smith (disambiguation)

Township name disambiguation pages